The Freebird II is a family of American side-by-side two-seat, high wing, tricycle gear,  pusher configuration single engined kit aircraft originally designed for construction by amateur builders by the Freebird Airplane Company of Marshville, North Carolina, and later Pro Sport Aviation of Wingate, North Carolina.

The Freebird II was produced until late 2014 by Free Bird Innovations of Detroit Lakes, Minnesota, as the LiteSport Classic.

Development
The Freebird I was introduced at Sun 'n Fun 1996, and was intended to meet the requirements of the US FAR 103 Ultralight Vehicles category under the two-seat trainer exemption, although it is now offered in the US Light Sport Aircraft or amateur-built categories.

The Freebird II is constructed from bolted aluminum tubing, covered with doped aircraft fabric. The aircraft features conventional three-axis controls, including a trim system. The tricycle landing gear is steered by differential braking and a castering nosewheel. The company estimated that an average builder would take 120 hours to build the aircraft from the assembly kit.

The  Rotax 582 is also used.

The Freebird II's wings can be folded in five minutes by one person and the aircraft can then be trailered or stored. Options available included full cabin doors, flaperons, brakes, wheel pants and a custom-fitted trailer.

Variants
Freebird II
Initial version, two seats in side-by-side configuration,  wingspan,  Rotax 503, built by Freebird Airplane Company.
Sportlite SS
Improved version, two seats in side-by-side configuration,  wingspan,  Rotax 503, built by Free Bird Innovations.
Sportlite 2
Improved version, two seats in side-by-side configuration,  wingspan,  Rotax 503, built by Free Bird Innovations.
LiteSport II
Improved version, two seats in tandem configuration,  wingspan,  Rotax 503, built by Free Bird Innovations. 352 examples had been completed and flown by 2011.
LiteSport Classic
Current production version, two seats in side-by-side configuration,  wingspan,  Rotax 503 or  Rotax 582, built by Free Bird Innovations. 102 examples had been completed and flown by 2011.

Specifications (Freebird II)

See also

References

External links

Free Bird Innovations aircraft
1990s United States ultralight aircraft
Light-sport aircraft
Single-engined pusher aircraft